Camiña Balay Nga Bato (Stone House), formerly known as Avanceña House, is a century-old heritage house in the Arevalo district, Iloilo City, Philippines. It was built in 1865 and was designed by the first parish priest of Molo, Anselmo Avanceña, for Don Fernando Avanceña and his wife, Eulalia Abaja. It was then passed on from one family to another until it came under the Camiñas family.[1] It is now owned by the fourth generation of the original owners, Gerard Camiña, former director of the Land Transportation Office in Western Visayas, and his wife, Luth Camiña. The ancestral house was declared as an "important cultural property" by the National Museum in 2015.

The heritage house is also now a heritage museum and a restaurant, serving a variety of Ilonggo delicacies and its well-known homemade tsokolate tablea (chocolate tablets).

History 
It was once the home of Fernando Avancena and his wife, Eulalia Abaja, and was built in the 1860s. The structure of the house was patterned after the bahay kubo, or "cube house." It was made of strong and natural materials—the roof was made of bamboo and nipa; the floors were made of narra and ivory. The foundation was supported by 24 tree trunks. The business of the family was hablon weaving. A hablon is a handmade cloth with intricate designs. The family's hablon business is still active today and is led by current owners, Gerard Camiña and wife, Luth Camiña. In 2010, the owners made the ancestral house open to the public as a heritage museum and as a restaurant.

On December 23, 2015, it was declared as an important cultural property by the National Museum by virtue of Resolution No. 23-2015 and Republic Act 10066 (National Cultural Heritage Act of 2009).

References 

Buildings and structures in Iloilo City
Houses completed in 1865
Historic house museums in the Philippines
Heritage Houses in the Philippines
Tourist attractions in Iloilo City